
Gmina Banie Mazurskie is a rural gmina (administrative district) in Gołdap County, Warmian-Masurian Voivodeship, in northern Poland, on the border with Russia.

Villages

Gmina Banie Mazurskie contains the villages and settlements of:

Antomieszki
Audyniszki
Banie Mazurskie
Borek
Brożajcie
Budziska
Czupowo
Dąbrówka Polska
Dąbrówka Polska-Osada
Grodzisko
Grunajki
Gryżewo
Jagiele
Jagoczany
Jeglewo
Kiermuszyny Wielkie
Kierzki
Klewiny
Kruki
Kulsze
Liski
Lisy
Maciejowa Wola
Miczuły
Mieczkówka
Mieczniki
Mieduniszki Małe
Mieduniszki Wielkie
Nowiny
Obszarniki
Radkiejmy
Rapa
Rogale
Różanka-Dwór
Sapałówka
Ściborki
Skaliszkiejmy
Śluza
Stadnica
Stare Gajdzie
Stary Żabin
Surminy
Szarek
Ustronie
Węgorapa
Widgiry
Wólka
Wróbel
Żabin
Żabin Graniczny
Żabin Rybacki
Zakałcze Wielkie
Zapały
Zawady
Ziemianki
Ziemiany

Neighbouring gminas
Gmina Banie Mazurskie is bordered by the gminas of Budry, Gołdap, Kowale Oleckie, Kruklanki and Pozezdrze. It also borders Russia (Kaliningrad oblast).

References
Polish official population figures 2006

Banie Mazurskie
Gołdap County